The Pingat Kehormatan is a Singaporean national honour instituted in 1970. It is a medal awarded to any member of the Singapore Armed Forces or the Singapore Police Force who has performed "any act or series of acts constituting distinguished conduct in active service in the field". In special circumstances, it may also be awarded to any person who performed an act which constitute as distinguished conduct while engaged active field service. The medal may be awarded posthumously. However, it has never been awarded since its inception.

References

External links
 Singapore Prime Minister's Office - The Medal of Honour

Civil awards and decorations of Singapore